(20 February 1912 – 28 December 1990) was a Japanese film director. He directed 101 films between 1934 and 1965.

Selected filmography
 Jūdai no yūwaku (1953)
 Keisatsu nikki (1955)
 Onna no koyomi (1954)

References

External links
 

1912 births
1990 deaths
Japanese film directors
People from Ibaraki Prefecture